Cyperus pseudovestitus is a species of sedge that is native to parts of Africa.

See also 
 List of Cyperus species

References 

pseudovestitus
Plants described in 1936
Flora of Eritrea
Flora of South Africa
Flora of Ethiopia
Flora of Angola
Flora of Madagascar
Flora of Mozambique
Flora of Namibia
Flora of Zimbabwe
Flora of Swaziland
Taxa named by Georg Kükenthal